Not Available is the fourth studio album by American art rock group the Residents, recorded in 1974. The album was allegedly meant to only be released once its creators completely forgot about its existence (adhering to their "Theory of Obscurity," in which an artist's purest work is created without an audience) - however, due to ongoing delays in the release of Eskimo, Not Available was released to supply the demand for new Residents material, given their unexpected critical and commercial success following the release of the Duck Stab EP.

History 
It is said that the lyrics and themes of Not Available arose from personal tensions within the group, and that the project began as a private psychodrama before being adapted into a possible operetta. While the project never took off theatrically, it was still molded into a sort of concept album, taking use of assorted musical ideas, some of them recorded for the group's unfinished film project, Vileness Fats. It is unknown if further overdubs were added onto the album predating its release in 1978, or if the music was released as is.

It is possible that the album was shelved not to fulfill the "Theory of Obscurity," but because it was simply too personally revealing.

Music 
The music on Not Available is fairly different from any other music the Residents have recorded in the time period it was supposedly conceived in, both in compositional skill and audio quality. Fans have theorized that the music could have been recorded at a later period.

The album is split into four parts and an epilogue, with the Residents' characteristic use of drum machines, classical percussion, cartoonish vocals, grand piano and horns, as well as notably the use of string synthesizers.The lyrics and plot of Not Available are told in a densely surrealistic manner, notably making use of a Greek chorus and a particular piano composition that is presented as a theme for one of the album's characters - the full recording was released in 2010 as "Available Piece."

A 2011 reissue of the album extended its duration by approximately seven minutes, allegedly its original length. A mix of the album's multitrack tapes (originally titled X is for Xtra) was released in 2019 on a deluxe edition of the album.

Track listing

1987 CD bonus tracks 
Tracks 6-11 taken from Title in Limbo, a 1983 album made in collaboration with Renaldo and the Loaf.

2011 extended edition

2018 pREServed edition 

After 10 minutes of silence following track 19, an unlisted track plays lasting 4:46.

References

External links 
 Not Available on Prog Archives
 Official Not Available page

The Residents albums
Rock operas
1978 albums
Concept albums
Ralph Records albums